The 1977 Austrian motorcycle Grand Prix was the second round of the 1977 Grand Prix motorcycle racing season. It took place on 1 May 1977 at the Salzburgring circuit.

The opening race was for the 350 cc category. This race was abandoned after eight laps following an accident which led to the death of Hans Stadelmann from head injuries, and seriously injured Johnny Cecotto, Patrick Fernandez, Dieter Braun and Franco Uncini. The 125 cc race was due to run after the 350 cc race, but the 125 cc riders staged a sitdown strike and there was a delay before their race took place. Riders in the 500 cc category organised a boycott of their race which led to only 14 competitors taking part. The FIM, motorcycle racing's governing body, initially issued formal warnings to Barry Sheene and Ángel Nieto but later in the year the punishments were retracted.

500cc classification

125 cc classification

Sidecar classification

References

Austrian motorcycle Grand Prix
Austrian
Motorcycle Grand Prix